is a Japanese actor who is affiliated with Amuse, Inc. He played the role of Kai Ozu (Magi Red), the main character of the 2005 Super Sentai TV series Mahou Sentai Magiranger.

Biography
Hashimoto had an interest in acting since he was in high school as a junior. He auditioned for an entertainment office on the basis of the magazine at the time of his first year high school, he passed and belonged to Amuse, Inc.

In 2004, Hashimoto debuted in Water Boys 2. In 2005, he starred  in the 29th Super Sentai series, Mahou Sentai Magiranger; in 2007, he appeared in Asadora's Chiritotechin as the heroine's brother; in 2014, he appeared in the drama, Gunshi Kanbei; in 2015, he appeared in Drama Series W, such as Yumewoataeru, and appeared on other television dramas and films.

Hashimoto's stage work of the director of recent years various talented people (such as Amon Miyamoto) they had appeared in.

In 2014, he appeared in the stage play History Boys and won the 22nd Yomiuri Theater Grand Prix Excellence Award. Hashimoto was in the 59th Kishida Drama Award in a meeting of the play Troisgros, and his work was awarded.

Filmography

TV series

References

External links
 Official profile at Amuse, Inc. 

1987 births
Living people
Japanese male film actors
Japanese male television actors
Male actors from Tokyo
Amuse Inc. talents
21st-century Japanese male actors
21st-century Japanese singers
21st-century Japanese male singers